Baicalein (5,6,7-trihydroxyflavone) is a flavone, a type of flavonoid, originally isolated from the roots of Scutellaria baicalensis and Scutellaria lateriflora. It is also reported in Oroxylum indicum (Indian trumpetflower) and Thyme. It is the aglycone of baicalin. Baicalein is one of the active ingredients of Sho-Saiko-To, which is a Chinese classic herbal formula, and listed in Japan as Kampo medicine. As a Chinese herbal supplement, it is believed to enhance liver health. 

Baicalein, along with its analogue baicalin, is a positive allosteric modulator of the benzodiazepine site and/or a non-benzodiazepine site of the GABAA receptor. It displays subtype selectivity for α2 and α3 subunit-containing GABAA receptors. In accordance, baicalein shows anxiolytic effects in mice without incidence of sedation or myorelaxation. It is thought that baicalein, along with other flavonoids, may underlie the anxiolytic effects of S. baicalensis and S. lateriflora. Baicalein is also an antagonist of the estrogen receptor, or an antiestrogen.

The flavonoid has been shown to inhibit certain types of lipoxygenases and act as an anti-inflammatory agent. It has antiproliferative effects on ET-1-induced proliferation of pulmonary artery smooth muscle cell proliferation via inhibition of TRPC1 channel expression. Possible antidepressant effects have also been attributed to baicalein in animal research.

Baicalein is an inhibitor of CYP2C9, an enzyme of the cytochrome P450 system that metabolizes drugs in the body.

A derivative of baicalin is a known prolyl endopeptidase inhibitor.

Baicalein has been shown to inhibit Staphylococcus aureus biofilm formation and the quorum sensing system in vitro.

It has also been shown to be effective in vitro against all forms of Borrelia burgdorferi and Borrelia garinii.

Glycosides
Tetuin is the 6-glucoside of baicalein.

See also
 List of compounds with carbon number 15

References

Aromatase inhibitors
Flavones
Pyrogallols
GABAA receptor positive allosteric modulators
Antiestrogens
Anxiolytics